is a Baptist Christian university in Fukuoka, Japan.

History
It was founded in 1916 as an academy for boys by Rev. C. K. Dozier, a Baptist missionary from the United States.In 1949, it became a university. The chancellor of Seinan Gakuin is Yoshiki Terazono, and Gary W. Barkley, a former Baptist missionary, has served as the university president since December 2006. Seinan Gakuin University is located in Sawara Ward of Fukuoka and is between the Nishijin and Fujisaki subway stations.

Points of interest
 Seinan Gakuin University Biblical Botanical Garden

References

External links
 Seinan Gakuin University official site

Educational institutions established in 1916
Baptist universities and colleges
Private universities and colleges in Japan
Seinan Gakuin University
1916 establishments in Japan
Association of Christian Universities and Colleges in Asia